Police Football Club is a football team from Trinidad and Tobago, founded in 1975. It is based in Saint James, being currently a member of the TT Pro League, the professional Trinidarian league and the top division in the Trinidad and Tobago football league system.

The club was a finalist of the 1991 CONCACAF Champions' Cup, but lost to Liga MX club Puebla 4–2 on aggregate.

References

External links
 

Football clubs in Trinidad and Tobago
Association football clubs established in 1975
1975 establishments in Trinidad and Tobago
Police association football clubs